The Tour de Murrieta is a multi-day cycling race held annually in March around Murrieta, California.

Winners

Men

Women

References

External links

Cycle races in the United States
Recurring sporting events established in 2005
2005 establishments in California
Sports competitions in California
Murrieta, California